Things commonly known as cyberstar or cyberstars include:
 Internet celebrity
 virtual actor, a computer-generated human-like entity in a film
 Cyberstar, the animatronic and video controller for Chuck E. Cheese's and Showbiz Pizza Place